Lutzerath is an Ortsgemeinde – a municipality belonging to a Verbandsgemeinde, a kind of collective municipality – in the Cochem-Zell district in Rhineland-Palatinate, Germany. It belongs to the Verbandsgemeinde of Ulmen, whose seat is in the like-named town. Lutzerath is a recognized recreational resort (Erholungsort).

Geography

Location
Lutzerath lies in the Vulkaneifel, a part of the Eifel known for its volcanic history, geographical and geological features, and even ongoing activity today, including gases that sometimes well up from the earth. It is not, however, in the district bearing this same name. Lutzerath is found on a high ridge (435 m above sea level) framed by dales, woods and meadows, between the state spa of Bad Bertrich and the tourist resort of Daun. Nearby are some crater lakes.

Constituent communities
Besides the main centre, also called Lutzerath, there is an outlying centre called Driesch.

Alongside Driesch, there are residential areas that also belong to Lutzerath: Jagdhaus Flöder, Auf der Acht, Altmühle, Neumühle, Waldhaus Lutzerath and Waldhof.

History
In 1051, Lutzerath had its first documented mention and was long an Electoral-Trier holding. In 1726, a main post office with a horse-changing station was built in Lutzerath. With the French Revolutionary occupation of the lands on the Rhine’s left bank between 1794 and 1796, Lutzerath passed to the canton of Lutzerath. In 1815 it was assigned to the Kingdom of Prussia at the Congress of Vienna. Since 1946, it has been part of the then newly founded state of Rhineland-Palatinate.

The outlying centre of Driesch formed together with Lutzerath a single municipality until 1922 when it became a separate one. On 7 June 1969, however, it was amalgamated with Lutzerath once again.

Politics

Municipal council
The council is made up of 16 council members, who were elected by proportional representation at the municipal election held on 7 June 2009, and the honorary mayor as chairman.

The municipal election held on 7 June 2009 yielded the following results:

Mayor
Lutzerath’s mayor is Günter Welter, and his deputies are Roswitha Lescher, Werner Trasser and Hermann-Josef Kesseler.

Coat of arms
The municipality’s arms might be described thus: Argent a cross gules surmounted by an inescutcheon sable charged with a palm leaf bendwise slipped and in sinister chief three stones Or.

Town partnerships
Lutzerath fosters partnerships with the following places:
 Givry-en-Argonne, Marne, France since 1981

Culture and sightseeing

Buildings
The following are listed buildings or sites in Rhineland-Palatinate’s Directory of Cultural Monuments:

Lutzerath (main centre)
 Saint Stephen’s Catholic Parish Church (Pfarrkirche St. Stephan), Kirchstraße – aisleless church, 1773-1775; three-floor west tower, marked 1818, building inspector Maeler, expansion 1962; outside: missionary cross, Crucifixion group, 1869
 Jewish graveyard (monumental zone) – 11 grave steles from 1689 to 1942
 Dauner Straße 20 – Quereinhaus (a combination residential and commercial house divided for these two purposes down the middle, perpendicularly to the street), earlier half of the 19th century
 Graveyard – sandstone grave cross, 18th century; gravestone, 19th century; graveyard cross, 19th or 20th century; Gothic Revival gravestone, 1854
 Trierer Straße 22/24 – three-floor, twelve-axis solid building, marked 1835
 Trierer Straße 23 – former estate complex along the street; timber-frame house, 19th century
 Trierer Straße 34 – former rectory; solid building, 1848
 Trierer Straße 36 – former school; plastered building, mid 19th century
 On the way out of the village, on Landesstraße (State Road) 103 going towards Bad Bertrich – wayside chapel; Gothic Revival chapel, crow-stepped gable, earlier half of the 19th century; retable dating from time of building
 On Landesstraße 103, south of Lutzerath – open wayside chapel, Bildstock, 18th century
 On Landesstraße 52 going towards Strotzbüsch – sandstone wayside cross, marked 1819

Driesch 
 Rudolf-Schneiders-Straße – Mater Dolorosa Catholic Pilgrimage Church (Wallfahrtskirche Mater Dolorosa) – twin-naved hall church, 1478-1496, Late Gothic tower roof and Gothic nave roof destroyed in 1687, built anew in 1691, west portal 1868; outside circuit path, 1755, with Stations of the Cross, 1757, Johann Heinrich Nilles, Wittlich; whole complex with church and circuit path
 Rudolf-Schneider-Straße 2 – timber-frame house, partly solid or slated, marked 1787 
 Unterdorfstraße – three basalt fountain basins

Other points of interest
 Achterhöhe lookout point
 Ice age caves on the Falkenlay

Economy and infrastructure
The municipality is characterized by agriculture, tourism and trade. As the main centre in the surrounding area, Lutzerath has many infrastructural institutions.

References

External links

Municipality’s official webpage 

Cochem-Zell